Marián Kolmokov (born 23 March 1991) is a Slovak football defender who currently plays for Družstevník Čermany.

References

External links

1991 births
Living people
Sportspeople from Nitra
Association football central defenders
Slovak footballers
Slovakia under-21 international footballers
FC Nitra players
FK Slovan Duslo Šaľa players
Slovak Super Liga players